Pulse Global is a family of radio stations, playing new, unsigned, and emerging artists over the internet.  The following franchises are operating:-

Pulse Rated - operating from the UK and covering Europe and the rest of the world, Pulse Rated broadcasts over the internet 
Pulse Rated (Americas) - operates from Los Angeles, covering the North America region, broadcasting over the internet .

Company profile 
The two stations feature 2,300 acts from 39 countries, all of whom have been through the Pulse selection and legal process in order to grant Pulse specific non-exclusive rights. Corporate operations are managed from the UK division, who franchise the brand name and services out to various territories.

References

Internet radio stations in the United Kingdom
Internet radio stations in the United States